Crettyard is a hamlet in County Laois, Ireland. It is situated on the border with County Kilkenny, near Newtown, at the junction of the N78 national primary route and the R431 regional road.

Education
Schools serving the area include Newtown National School and Mayo National School.

Sports

Athletics 
The local athletics club, St Abban's AC, was established in 1955. The club has had a number of successes at county, provincial and national level throughout the years producing international athletes such as Barry Pender (High Jump), Paul Byrne (400mH), Brian Kelly (800m), Eoin Kelly (Triple Jump), Saragh Buggy (Triple Jump), Nessa Millet (400mh - National Junior Record Holder 2013), and Ruby Millet (Long Jump - National Junior Indoor Record Holder - 2019). The club's facility is located just off the Carlow - Castlecomer Rd and consists of a cinder style  track with tartan on LJ, TJ, PV and HJ areas. It also has a  loop for longer distances.

Gaelic games
The village is home to Crettyard GAA club.

Soccer
Crettyard United compete in the Carlow premier division. They have won the division on several occasions. They also compete in the Leinster Senior Cup.

See also
 List of towns and villages in Ireland

References 

Towns and villages in County Laois
Townlands of County Laois